Southern Pacific Railroad's MC-1 class of steam locomotive consisted of two locomotives built by Baldwin Locomotive Works in April 1909.  They are the first two locomotives converted by Southern Pacific (SP) to run as cab forward locomotives.

The first of these two, number 4000, entered service on May 26, 1909.  It was rebuilt as a cab forward and reclassified as an MC-2 in June 1923.  Another rebuild on June 4, 1931, "simpled" it with uniform cylinders and reclassified it as an AC-1.  4000 was scrapped on April 2, 1948.  The second locomotive in this class, 4001, entered service on May 30, 1909.  It was rebuilt as an MC-2 in April 1923, "simpled" on February 9, 1931, retired from active service on May 23, 1947, and scrapped on June 14, 1947, at SP's Sacramento shops.

References

External links 
 Southern Pacific 'Articulated' Class MC-1

MC-1
2-8-8-2 locomotives
Baldwin locomotives
Railway locomotives introduced in 1909
Mallet locomotives
Steam locomotives of the United States
Scrapped locomotives
Standard gauge locomotives of the United States